Polygamous unions are legal in Libya. Previously, under the rule of Muammar Gaddafi, a man needed to prove that he was capable of providing for the wives with reasons and required the consent of the first wife. This changed in February 2013, however, when the Constitutional Court overturned the previous law.

Depending on pre-2011 censuses, percent of polygamists in Libya decreased from 3.56% in 1995, to 2.57% in 2006.

References

Sexuality in Libya
Libya